Angel Island may refer to:
Angel Island (California), historic site of the United States Immigration Station, Angel Island, and part of Angel Island State Park, in San Francisco Bay, California
Angel Island, Papua New Guinea
Angel Island (novel), by Inez Haynes Gillmore
Angel Island (Sonic the Hedgehog), a fictional location in the Sonic video game series

See also
Angel Island–Tiburon Ferry
Angel Island chuckwalla, endemic to Isla Ángel de la Guarda
Angel Island mouse
Island Angel, 1993 album by Altan